Goodbye Volcano High is an upcoming narrative adventure indie game developed and published by Montreal-based studio KO_OP. The game is scheduled for release on 15 June 2023, for the PlayStation 4, PlayStation 5 and Windows.

Synopsis 
Set in a world of anthropomorphic dinosaur characters, the game centers on the members of the band VVorm Drama; the non-binary lead vocalist Fang (Lachlan Watson), guitarist Trish (Ozioma Akagha) and drummer Reed (Mark Whitten), alongside the school's student council president Naomi (Allegra Clark) and Fang's brother Naser (Abe Bueno-Jallad), - as they venture through the highs and lows of their final year as Volcano High seniors with graduation looming over the horizon while coming to terms with their own impending extinction.

Gameplay 
The game features narrative segments, and rhythm minigames during performances by VVorm Drama.

Development 
The game was initially announced during Sony's "Future of Gaming" online presentation on 11 June 2020, with a release window of 2021. In August 2021, KO_OP announced a delay of Goodbye Volcano High release until sometime in 2022. The developers wanted to avoid crunch related to the COVID-19 pandemic, and had already brought in a new writing team from Sweet Baby Inc. in June 2020 to reboot the game's entire narrative direction. In November 2022, the game was delayed to 2023. A new gameplay trailer premiered during a Sony "State of Play" presentation on 23 February 2023, announcing a release date of 15 June.

The game's use of queer characters and LGBT themes resulted in notable harassment campaigns by users of the imageboard 4chan, a group of users from the site known as "Cavemanon" developed a parody of the game titled "Snoot Game". KO_OP and various journalist outlets have claimed the fangame to contain anti-LGBT themes (such as a goal for the player to coerce Fang into detransitioning, the controversial fangame also contains a possible ending where Fang performs a mass shooting as a result of bullying and harassment.) Attacks against KO_OP's Discord server related to the fangame and users from 4chan have also occurred. A representative of the studio told Kotaku claimed that the fangame was made in "bad faith", arguing that developers of games featuring queer characters "will face harassment no matter where you go", and stating that "we care deeply about the work we are doing and are excited to share it with the world."

References

External links 
 
 

Adventure games
Dinosaurs in video games
Fictional musical groups
High school-themed video games
Indie video games
LGBT-related video games
Music video games
PlayStation 4 games
PlayStation 5 games
Single-player video games
Upcoming video games scheduled for 2023
Video games developed in Canada
Video games postponed due to the COVID-19 pandemic
Visual novels
Windows games